The Cumberland Valley School District is a large, rural and suburban public school district located in Central Pennsylvania. It covers Hampden Township, Monroe Township, Middlesex Township and Silver Spring Township in Cumberland County, Pennsylvania. According to 2000 federal census data, it served a resident population of 46,926. By 2010, the district's population increased to 54,670 people. In 2009, the district residents’ per capita income was  $28,440, while the median family income was $66,515. In the Commonwealth, the median family income was $49,501 and the United States median family income was $49,445, in 2010. By 2013, the median household income in the United States rose to $52,100.

The district is served by the Capital Area Intermediate Unit 15, which offers a variety of services, including a completely developed K-12 curriculum that is mapped and aligned with the Pennsylvania Academic Standards (available online), shared services, a group purchasing program and a wide variety of special education and special needs services.

Schools
Cumberland Valley School District operates eight Elementary Schools (K-5th), two Middle Schools (6th-8th) and Cumberland Valley High School (9th-12th).

 Cumberland Valley High School
 Eagle View Middle School
 Mountain View Middle School
 Good Hope Middle School (Not in use anymore)
 Green Ridge Elementary School
 Hampden Elementary School
 Middlesex Elementary School
 Monroe Elementary School
 Shaull Elementary School
 Silver Spring Elementary School
 Sporting Hill Elementary School
 Winding Creek Elementary School

Extracurriculars
Cumberland Valley School District also provides a wide variety of clubs, activities and an extensive sports program. Varsity and junior varsity athletic activities are under the Pennsylvania Interscholastic Athletic Association.

Sports
The District funds:
High School:

Boys
Baseball - AAAA
Basketball- AAAA
Bowling - AAAA
Cross Country - AAA
Football - AAAA
Golf - AAA
Lacrosse - AAAA
Soccer - AAA
Swimming and Diving - AAA
Tennis - AAA
Track and Field - AAA
Volleyball - AAA
Water Polo - AAAA
Wrestling - AAA

Girls
Basketball - AAAA
Bowling - AAAA
Cross Country - AAA
Competitive chess - AAAA
Field Hockey - AAA
Golf - AAA
Lacrosse - AAAA
Soccer (Fall) - AAA
Softball - AAAA
Swimming and Diving - AAA
Girls' Tennis - AAA
Track and Field - AAA
Volleyball - AAA
Water Polo - AAAA

Middle School Sports:

Boys
Basketball
Cross Country
Soccer
Track and Field	

Girls
Basketball
Cross Country
Field Hockey
Track and Field
Volleyball 

According to PIAA directory July 2012

References

External links
Cumberland Valley School District 
Monroe Elementary School

Education in Harrisburg, Pennsylvania
Susquehanna Valley
School districts in Cumberland County, Pennsylvania
Schools in Cumberland County, Pennsylvania